Gurnee is a village in Lake County, Illinois, United States. Its population was 30,706 as of the 2020 census. It borders the city of Waukegan, and is a popular tourist attraction within the Chicago metropolitan area. 

Best known for being the location of Six Flags Great America, Six Flags Hurricane Harbor Chicago and Gurnee Mills, the village sees an average of over 23 million visitors annually.

History 
Early settlers in the Gurnee area came by foot horseback and by "Prairie Schooners" drawn by oxen or via the Erie Canal and the Great Lakes. They came from the town of Warren, New York, which was named in honor of Major General Joseph Warren, killed at the Battle of Bunker Hill. Warren Township, formed in 1850, was also named after him. The first settlement of Warren Township commenced in 1835 in the vicinity of the Aux Plaines River (now the Des Plaines River).

In 1835–36, a land company from New York State erected a Community House (site of the old Gurnee Grade School) to accommodate families while they were locating and getting government land grants to their farms. Near the Community House, there was a ford used by the Potowatomi Indians for crossing the river. A floating log bridge was built in 1842. Later, both a wood and iron bridge were built.

With the erection of a permanent bridge, roads were established, and this area became the hub of the township. It was at this junction that the Milwaukee Road crossed the river from west to east, and then continued north to eventually connect Chicago to Milwaukee. This road was "laid out" in 1836 by three early settlers: Thomas McClure, Mark Noble, and Richard Steele. The east–west road, now known as Grand Avenue, was a main route from McHenry County to the port of Waukegan. Stage coaches ran on this route as late as 1870.

The hamlet was originally called "Wentworth", after Congressman "Long John" Wentworth, who also served as the Republican Mayor of Chicago between 1857 and 1863.  Thereafter, Walter S. Gurnee, the 14th Mayor of Chicago and one of the directors of the railroad, agreed to develop a station in Wentworth, which was called "Gurnee Station" in honor of Mr. Gurnee. Over time, Gurnee Station became known simply as "Gurnee" and was incorporated as such.

Just east of the bridge, at the junction of Milwaukee Road and Grand Avenue, was the Mutaw Tavern, earlier known as "Marm Rudd's Tavern" and more recently as the Mother Rudd House. This was a stage coach stop between Chicago and Milwaukee and was a stopover for farmers from the west traveling to Little Fort (now known as Waukegan) to barter their crops for supplies and to ship out from the ports. It also served as a stop during the underground railroad. This building was acquired by the Village of Gurnee in 1984, has been restored, and now houses the Warren Township Historical Society.

In May 2004, Gurnee received major rainfall, causing the worst flooding in 100 years. The flood forced several schools to close and caused building damage to dozens of homes and businesses.

Geography
Gurnee is located at  (42.3737, −87.9344).

It is located on the banks of the Des Plaines River and is split by Interstate 94, which divides the village into east (old) and west (new) sides.

Demographics

2020 census

2010 Census
As of the 2010 census, the total village population was 31,295, an 8.5% increase from the 2000 census. There were 12,031 housing units throughout the village, and the population density was 2,318.7 people per square mile. The racial makeup of the village was 73.3% White, 11.6% Asian, 7.8% African American, 0.03% Native American, and 3.5% from other races, and 3.2% from two or more races. Hispanic or Latino of any race made up 11.7% of the population.

42.3% of the households had children under the age of 18 living with them, 62.6% were married couples living together, 7.8% had a female householder with no husband present, and 27.4% were non-families. Of all households, 22.7% were made up of individuals, and 6.4% had someone living alone who was 65 years of age or older. The average household size was 2.71, and the average family size was 3.25.

The median household income was estimated to be $85,421, while the per capita income for the village was $35,564.  According to a 2007 estimate, males had a median income of $56,274 versus $35,713 for females. In 2010, 5.1% of the population was reported to be under the poverty line.

Economy

Tourism 
Gurnee is home to multiple amusement parks, shopping centers and hotels. In total, the town brings around 23 million visitors annually. Six Flags Great America has operated since 1976, originally as Marriott's Great America, and during earlier years was expected to draw in 6 million to 7 million people within the Chicago, Rockford and Milwaukee areas. Six Flags Hurricane Harbor Chicago opened in 2005 and drew 1.3 million guests in its opening year. Gurnee Mills has attracted between 15 million to 20 million visitors per year since its opening in 1991. The mall was advertised as the "world's largest outlet mall" upon its opening, and is the fourth largest mall in Illinois. The  resort Great Wolf Lodge, formerly Key Lime Cove opened in 2007 and has an indoor waterpark; it was sold to Great Wolf Resorts in 2017 due to its underperformance.

Top employers
According to Gurnee's 2021 Comprehensive Annual Financial Report, the top employers in the village were:

Schools 
The majority of the eastern half of the village is served by Gurnee School District #56. Four schools make up District #56. They are:

 River Trail School (grades K-8)
 Prairie Trail School (grades 3–5)
 Spaulding School (grades PK-2)
 Viking Middle School (grades 6–8)

The western section of Gurnee, along with portions of the village's eastside is served by Woodland Grade School District #50. Woodland comprises:
 Woodland Middle School (grades 6–8)
 Woodland Intermediate School (grades 4–5)
 Woodland Elementary School (grades 1–3)
 Woodland Primary School (K)
 Prairie Crossing Charter School (Grades K-8)
The village is served by Warren Township High School, which is made up of the O'Plaine Road Campus (freshmen and sophomores) and the Almond Road Campus (juniors and seniors).
According to the 2007 state report card, both Woodland District #50 and Gurnee School District #56 has full recognition.

Library 

The Gurnee Public Library is located at 224 N. O'Plaine Road. The Warren-Newport Public Library offers a collection of over 270,000 books, hundreds of magazines, and over 37,000 CDs and DVDs, as well as programming for all ages designed to provide personal enrichment, education and entertainment. The library serves a population of 60,000 residents.

The Warren-Newport Public Library District began in 1971, when the Gurnee Women's Club began to look for a meaningful service which their club could offer the area. Opening day for the library came on January 10, 1973. The library opened its doors for 45 hours per week with 3,000 volumes. The library moved into its current location in 1978. In 1997, the library opened a $5.6 million,  addition. In the fall of 2010, an $8.5 million construction project began, adding 4,500 square feet and renovating 28,000 square feet of the oldest parts of the building.

Lake County, Illinois communities that fall completely within the boundaries of the district are Gurnee, Illinois; Grandwood Park, Illinois; Park City, Illinois; and Wildwood, Illinois. Partially included in the district are the communities of Beach Park, Illinois; Grayslake, Illinois; Lake Villa, Illinois; Old Mill Creek, Illinois; Third Lake, Illinois; Wadsworth, Illinois; Waukegan, Illinois; and Millburn, Illinois.

In 2004, the library was one of the early adopters of passive RFID (radio frequency identification) technology for the automation of item check-in (News Sun, September 28, 2004).

According to statistics gathered by the Library Research Center at the University of Illinois, the Warren-Newport Public Library is the second busiest library in Lake County, after the Cook Memorial Library in Libertyville. (News Sun, October 3, 2006).

According to its mission statement, the Warren Newport Public Library "provides the community with access to information, kindles the imagination of children and adults, and supports lifelong learning."

Transportation 
Interstate 94 (The Tri-State Tollway) is the main expressway servicing Gurnee, allowing easy access to Milwaukee and Chicago.

Gurnee is notable as being one of the only major Chicago suburbs that is not serviced by Metra, although there are nearby stations in Waukegan, Grayslake, and Libertyville.

Drinking water supply
The Village of Gurnee water supply comes from the Central Lake County Joint Action Water Agency (CLCJAWA) located in Lake Bluff, IL. CLCJAWA purifies water from Lake Michigan.

Government

Elected officials 
The village of Gurnee is a home rule municipality which functions under the council-manager form of government with a Village President and a six-member Board of Trustees, all of whom are elected to four-year terms. The Village President and three of the Trustees are elected every four years. The other group of three Trustees are also elected for four-year terms, but this election is staggered and takes place two years after the first group.

As of 2021, the village office holders are:

 Mayor: Thomas B. Hood (term ends April 30, 2025)
 Clerk: Andy Harris (term ends April 30, 2025)
 Trustee: Jeanne E. Balmes (term ends April 30, 2025)
 Trustee: Kevin Woodside (term ends April 30, 2025)
 Trustee: Karen Thorstenson (term ends April 30, 2025)
 Trustee: Quin O'Brien (term ends April 30, 2023)
 Trustee: Greg Garner (term ends April 30, 2023)
 Trustee: Cheryl Ross (term ends April 30, 2023)

Mayors (past and present) 
 Leo Felton 1928-1941
 Dr. W. W. Smith 1941-1942 (resigned to enter Armed Services)
 Wm. Barnstable 1942-1949
 Gordon D. Gillings 1949-1973
 Richard Welton 1973-2001
 Don Rudny 2001-2005
 Kristina Kovarik 2005–2021
 Thomas B. Hood 2021-present

Notable people 

 Kevin Anderson, actor
 Robbie Gould, football player
 Tommie Harris, football player
 Tank Johnson, football player
 Allen James Lynch (born 1945), soldier in the United States Army and recipient of the Medal of Honor for heroic actions during the Vietnam War
 Muhsin Muhammad, football player 
 Brandon Paul, basketball player
 Greg Rallo, hockey player
 Tim Weigel, Chicago television broadcaster

References

External links

 Village of Gurnee

 
Chicago metropolitan area
Villages in Lake County, Illinois
Villages in Illinois
Populated places established in 1928
Populated places on the Underground Railroad